Luke Mullins (born 24 December 1984) is an Australian rules footballer who played with Collingwood in the Australian Football League (AFL).

Mullins played his early football with the Wangaratta Rovers and was picked up by Collingwood in the 2003 Pre-Season Draft, from the Murray Bushrangers. He made his debut against Fremantle at Docklands in the fourth round of the 2004 AFL season and had 13 disposals. His only other games were against St Kilda and Adelaide in rounds eight and nine respectively.

References

External links
 
 

1984 births
Australian rules footballers from Victoria (Australia)
Collingwood Football Club players
Murray Bushrangers players
Wangaratta Rovers Football Club players
Living people